Sudanese Australians are people of Sudanese origin or descent living in Australia. The largest population of Sudanese Australians reside in Victoria (6,085).

Brief history

Early migration
Before the First Sudanese Civil War, most Sudanese migrants arrived in Australia to pursue educational opportunities in both undergraduate and post graduate institutions across Australia. The large number of Sudanese migrant settled in the states like Victoria and New South Wales.

After the first civil war

A larger influx of Sudanese emigrated to Australia as a result of political and economic problems. The most noticeable exodus occurred among professional and middle class Sudanese who along with their children took advantage of education and employment opportunities in Australia to emigrate.

After the second civil war

Since 1983, fighting between Sudan's government and the rebels in the south has killed about two million people. The fighting in Sudan has interfered with the production and distribution of food and caused widespread hunger. Many civilians in southern Sudan had fled their region because of this crisis. Some Sudanese Australians returned to their ancestral homeland when the conflict officially ended in 2005.

Crime and social issues 
Sudanese Australians have significant over-representation in many of Australia's crime statistics. Despite making up 0.16% of the total population of the state of Victoria, Sudanese-born offenders made up 7% of individuals charged in home invasions, 6% of those in car theft offenses and 14% of individuals charged with aggravated robbery offenses in 2016. Australians born in Sudan also had the highest imprisonment rate of any immigrant group in Australia, with imprisonment rates at nearly three times the Australian average in 2014. Sudanese-born offenders continue to be significantly over-represented in crime statistics; in 2018 they were by far the immigrant group with the highest offending rate in the state of Victoria, relative to their population size. Between 2015-2018 Sudanese-born males aged 10-17 had the highest rate of 'crimes against a person' offenses of 60/1,000, compared to a rate of 20/1,000 for Indigenous and 2/1,000 for non-Indigenous Australian born youth.

Census data 
The  recorded 19,369 people born in Sudan. Of these, the largest number were living in the state of Victoria, (6,085), followed by New South Wales (5,629), Western Australia (2,722) and then Queensland (2,582). 17,186 people indicated that they were of full or partial Sudanese ancestry. 

The Department of Immigration and Citizenship notes that South Sudan became independent from the Republic of Sudan on 9 July 2011, shortly before the census, and that "country of birth figures as completed by individuals at the time of the 2011 Census may not fully reflect this change". The census, held in August, included both Sudan and South Sudan amongst the country of birth and ancestry options.

Between 1996 and 2005, the largest increase in Australian people born overseas were Sudanese, at 28% per year. Other fast-growing overseas-born groups were people from Afghanistan (12% average increase per year) and Iraq (10%). Australian residents from sub-Saharan Africa increased on average by 6% per year over this period.

In the 2006 Census 17,848 residents in Australia reported having Sudanese ancestry. People of Sudanese descent now live in almost every capital city in Australia, particularly Melbourne (5,911), Sydney (5,335) and Perth (1,993)

Notable Sudanese Australians
Yassmin Abdel-Magied - Engineer, author, television presenter and activist
Edmond Atalla - Labor politician

See also

 African Australians
 South Sudanese Australians 
 Sudanese Americans
 Sudanese British

References

External links
 Sudanese Stories - An oral history project recording the migration journeys and settlement experiences of southern Sudanese refugees now living in Blacktown, Western Sydney.
 Australian Migration ABS migration statistics

 
Immigration to Australia
Sudanese diaspora
African Australian